The Valin River flows south, on the north shore of the St. Lawrence River, in the municipalities of L'Ange-Gardien and Château-Richer, in the La Côte-de-Beaupré Regional County Municipality in the administrative region of Capitale-Nationale, in the province of Quebec, in Canada.

The lower part of this small valley is served by avenue Royale (route 360) and route 138 which runs along the north shore of St. Lawrence River. The upper part has mountainous relief and is accessible only by secondary forest roads. Forestry is the main economic activity in this valley; agriculture (lower part) second.

The surface of the Valin River is generally frozen from the beginning of December until the end of March; however, safe traffic on the ice is generally from mid-December to mid-March. The water level of the river varies with the seasons and the precipitation; the spring flood occurs in March or April.

Geography 
The Valin River begins at the confluence of two streams in the mountains behind the Côte-de-Beaupré, in L'Ange-Gardien .

 to the east in a forest area curving northeast between two mountains, to a bend in the river located on the edge of the plateau of the La Grande Côte area;
 east in the agricultural zone to its mouth.

The Valin River flows into Château-Richer into a small bay on the northwest shore of the St. Lawrence River. This bay faces the mouth of the Pot au Beurre river of Île d'Orléans which is  via the chenal de l'Île d'Orléans. This mouth is located between the hamlet Valin (located on the south side), north of the "La Longue Pointe" area and south of the "Battures des Îlets" area.

Toponymy 
The toponym "Rivière Valin" was formalized on August 31, 1971, at the Place Names Bank of the Commission de toponymie du Québec.

See also 

 Chenal de l'Île d'Orléans
 Château-Richer, a municipality
 L'Ange-Gardien, a municipality
 La Côte-de-Beaupré Regional County Municipality
 Capitale-Nationale, an administrative region
 St. Lawrence River
 List of rivers of Quebec

Notes and references 

Rivers of Capitale-Nationale
La Côte-de-Beaupré Regional County Municipality